Jetterswiller is a commune (township) in the Bas-Rhin department in Grand Est in north-eastern France.

Geography
The village is the meeting point of several minor roads: to the west of the village the main road connecting Saverne and Molsheim is within walking distance.   The surrounding land is largely devoted to agriculture.  Adjacent communes are Reutenbourg to the north, Westhouse-Marmoutier and Knœrsheim to the north-east, Zehnacker to the east, Crastatt to the south-east, and  Singrist to the west.

See also
 Communes of the Bas-Rhin department

References

Communes of Bas-Rhin
Bas-Rhin communes articles needing translation from French Wikipedia